Yang Byung-yeol (born 23 November 1993) is a South Korean theatre, film and television actor. He debuted in 2015 in Naver TV's web drama Dream Knight and was active under the stage name 'Kang Yun-je'. He later on began working under his birth name Yang Byung-yeol. He came into prominence in 2021 in MBC TV series The Red Sleeve, and KBS weekend drama Young Lady and Gentleman. He also appeared in 2018 film The Princess and the Matchmaker. In 2022, he appearied as main lead in KBS's daily drama Bravo, My Life.

Career
Yang Byung-yeol is affiliated to artist management company Npio Entertainment.

In 2021, Yang was cast in historical romance TV series The Red Sleeve as Seong Sik, the elder brother of Seong Deok-im (Royal Noble Consort Uibin Seong) portrayed by Lee Se-young. His performance was appreciated and he received favorable reviews from viewers for his charming portrayal of the character. He was also recognised for his portrayal of Bong Joon-oh in KBS weekend drama Young Lady and Gentleman (2021-22). His "unrivaled performance" was appreciated in the 52 episodes series.

On March 5, 2022 Yang appeared in 546th episode of musical show Immortal Songs: Singing the Legend, which was Young Lady and Gentleman special. He along with Kim Yi-kyung sang a duet "Dream" .

In 2022, Yang appeared as main lead in KBS1 daily TV series Bravo, My Life, and won Excellence Award for Actor in a Daily Drama in 2022 KBS Drama Awards.

Filmography

Films

Television series

Awards and nominations

References

External links
 Yang Byung-yeol official website
 

 Yang Byung-yeol on Daum 

21st-century South Korean male actors
South Korean male television actors
South Korean male film actors 
Living people
1993 births
Hanyang University alumni